The 1920 Svenska Mästerskapet Final was played on 24 October 1920 between the eleventh-time finalists Djurgårdens IF and the first-time finalists IK Sleipner. The match decided the winner of 1920 Svenska Mästerskapet, the football cup to determine the Swedish champions. Djurgårdens IF won their fourth title with a 1–0 victory at Stockholm Olympic Stadium in Stockholm.

Route to the final

Djurgårdens IF 

Djurgården beat Mariebergs IK 5–1 in the preliminary round on 13 August 1920 at home. In the quarter-final, Djurgården won against Helsingborgs IF away, 2–1 on 19 September 1920. On 17 October 1920, Djurgården won the semi-final against IFK Göteborg at home in Stockholm, 1–0.

Djurgårdens IF made their eleventh appearance in a Svenska Mästerskapet final, having won three and lost seven, including the previous final against GAIS.

GAIS 

IK Sleipner entered in the second qualifying round and on 25 July 1920, beating IK City at home with 3–1. In the third qualifying round on 1 August 1920, IK Sleipner drew against Kalmar IS at home but won 3–1 after extra time. IK Sleipner was drawn against IFK Norrköping in the preliminary round, and the away-game match on 10 August 1920 ended in a 4–0 win. The away-game quarter-final against AIK on 3 October 1920 ended in a 1–1 draw and one week later, on 10 October 1920, IK Sleipner won the replay at home, 5–1. On 17 October 1920, IK Sleipner won the semi-final at home in Norrköping against IFK Uddevalla with 2–0.

IK Sleipner made their first Svenska Mästerskapet final.

Match details

References 

Print

1920
Djurgårdens IF Fotboll matches
IK Sleipner matches
Football in Stockholm
October 1920 sports events
Sports competitions in Stockholm
1920s in Stockholm